Hannes Sigurðsson (born 1960 in Reykjavík) is an art historian and an independent curator from Iceland. 

Hannes was appointed the director of the Akureyri Art Museum in 1999, where he served for almost 15 years, and is the founder and director of the Icelandic Cultural Enterprise ART.IS. Hannes received an MA degree in Art History from the University of California, Berkeley (1988-1990) and a BA degree from University College London (1985-1988) after having previously graduated from the Department of Painting at the Icelandic College of Arts and Crafts (1980-1984) and the Reykjavik College of Music as a flautist (1975-1984).

Hannes worked in New York for five years as an art correspondent where he began career as an independent curator, the first one of his kind in Iceland. 

Hannes has edited and published dozens of books and catalogues and curated over 350 exhibitions and large-scale projects.  This includes shows with Matthew Barney, Louise Bourgeois, Jenny Holzer, The Boyle Family, Per Kirkeby, Carolee Schneemann, Sally Mann, Orlan, Spencer Tunick, Joel-Peter Witkin, Andres Serrano, Henri Cartier-Bresson, Bill Viola, Fang Lijun, Yue Minjun, and Zhang Xiaogang.  Hannes has also done Rembrandt and Francisco Goya shows. 

Hannes has collaborated with museums, institutions, educational authorities, corporations and galleries around the world in Norway, Finland, Faroe Islands, Greenland, Latvia, Russia, Germany, England, Scotland, France, Spain, Jordan, India, Japan, China and the United States.

Hannes is the founder of the Icelandic Visual Arts Awards that were first held in 2006.

Publications 
 Hvítir Skuggar: Margrét Jónsdóttir. Listasafnið á Akureyri, 2009. 
 Hláturgas: Læknaskop frá vöggu til grafar. Reykjavík: art.is Books, 2001.  
 Flögð og fögur skinn. Reykjavík: art.is Books, 1998.

References

1960 births
Art historians
European art curators
Living people
Hannes Sigurdsson